Tiengemeten is an island in the Dutch province of South Holland. Before 1984 the island was administratively split between Goudswaard and Zuid-Beijerland, and until 2019 it was part of the municipality of Korendijk.

The name Tiengemeten refers to an ancient area measurement; one gemet is comparable with one acre so the name means ten-acre island.

The statistical area "Tiengemeten" had a population of around 10 until 2007. On 10 May 2007, the island was officially allowed to revert to its natural state after its inhabitants were relocated.

The Rien Poortvliet museum is located on the island.

References

Hoeksche Waard
Islands of South Holland
Islands of the Rhine–Meuse–Scheldt delta
Uninhabited islands of the Netherlands